Lifeguard (Heather Cameron) is a character, a superhero appearing in American comic books published by Marvel Comics. Created by writer Chris Claremont and artist Salvador Larroca, the character first appeared in X-Treme X-Men #6 (December 2001). She is primarily associated with the X-Men.

Lifeguard is a mutant, gaining whatever superhuman abilities are needed in a life-threatening situation. She and her brother Slipstream were briefly members of the segment of X-Men featured in the series X-Treme X-Men.

Fictional character biography

X-Treme X-Men

Heather and Davis Cameron were a lifeguard and a surfer, respectively, living in Surfers Paradise in Australia. Unbeknownst to them, their father is an underworld crime lord known as Viceroy, and upon his death they were attacked.  Together with Storm and Neal Shaara (the new Thunderbird), they managed to defeat their attackers. Heather discovered she was a mutant with the power to manifest whatever was necessary to save the life of someone in danger around her, including her own.  Her power enabled her to manifest wings, golden armor, the ability to breathe underwater, and many other less noticeable adaptations. Heather soon joined the splinter team of X-Men, and formed a romance with Thunderbird.

During a mission to infiltrate the ship of the intergalactic warlord, Khan, Heather's appearance changes to resemble the alien Shi'ar race, and it was theorized that she and Davis had some Shi'ar heritage. Jean Grey notes that the cranial markings on her head and the crest of feathers she had manifested indicated Heather is of Shi'ar royal ancestry. Also, an entry from Destiny's diary seems to imply that Heather and Davis were "Mothered by War," or Deathbird. The entry shows a picture of Deathbird and some of the X-Treme team. Her brother, unable to see past her new, alien appearance, leaves the team. Lifeguard and Thunderbird travel in search of him.

The Xavier Institute
Months later, Lifeguard and Thunderbird returned to the X-Men, apparently not locating Slipstream. Together with Thunderbird, she joined the X-Corporation. However this only lasted weeks, as there was a synchronized attack on several of the X-Corporation offices after the catastrophic events of M-Day, leading Cyclops to call for the disbanding of all offices.

Heather is one of a handful of mutants to have retained her powers in the wake of House of M. Still involved with Thunderbird III, she was not active in any X-Men roster, though the 198 Files verified her location as residing at the Xavier Institute for Higher Learning.

Utopia
Heather later resurfaces after the events of Schism as a member of Cyclops' street team with Boom Boom and Dazzler in San Francisco and Utopia.

Powers and abilities
Heather's mutant power allows her body to sense and react to any threat by transforming or manifesting a power to deal with the situation (similar to that of the X-Men's Darwin). In all of her appearances, she has only been shown to use this ability while defending herself and others. It is as yet unknown if she is able to use this ability for her own protection. She has a moderate level of control over this power and has sometimes been able to trigger it at will, although she has not displayed any control over the transformations or powers she manifests. Heather has mostly manifested physical changes such as extra arms, armored skin, wings, and a mermaid tail. However, in her first appearance, she also demonstrated hydrokinesis. The full extent of Lifeguard's abilities have yet to be revealed.

In her most recent appearance with the emergence of her inherent Shi'ar genome, she appeared to be locked into her final transformation of gold skin, wings, and claws, still unable to control her powers and possibly unable to transform any further or reverse the change.

In addition to her superhuman powers, Heather is a trained lifeguard and skilled swimmer.

Other versions

X-Men: The End
Lifeguard appears in X-Men: The End as a protector of Aliyah Bishop in the Shi'ar Imperium.

Reception

Critical reception 
Lukas Shayo of Screen Rant stated, "A mutant with the power to save lives, the aptly named Lifeguard can develop any ability necessary to save any life, be it her own or another's. If that means turning into metal, growing wings, or shapeshifting, Lifeguard will develop that power and subsequently save a life. As what essentially amounts to a stronger version of Darwin, Lifeguard doesn't really get the reputation she deserves. No mutant can ever surpass her ability to save lives, as their mutations are often tailored to other specific niches. With no upper limit to determine how she can shift, Lifeguard deserves her place among the Omega-levels."

Accolades 

 In 2015, Entertainment Weekly ranked Lifeguard 84th in their "Let's rank every X-Man ever" list.
 In 2016 Screen Rant ranked Lifeguard 7th in their "X-Men: 16 Mutants Who Just Disappeared From The Comics" list.
 In 2017, CBR.com ranked Lifeguard 8th in their "15 Superheroes Marvel Wants You To Forget" list.
 In 2018, CBR.com ranked Lifeguard 1st in their "20 Weirdest Mutants To Ever Be X-Men" list.
 In 2020, Scary Mommy included Lifeguard in their "Looking For A Role Model? These 195+ Marvel Female Characters Are Truly Heroic" list.
 In 2020, CBR.com ranked Lifeguard 3rd in their "X-Treme X-Men's 10 Most Powerful Members" list.
 In 2021, Screen Rant included Lifeguard in their "Marvel's Most Powerful X-Men Members That Time Forgot" list.
 In 2022, Screen Rant included Lifeguard in their "X-Men: Synch & 9 Other Mutants Who Could Become Omega Level" list.

References

External links
MarvelDatabase:Lifeguard
MarvelDatabase:Character Gallery Lifeguard
Lifeguard on the Marvel Universe Character Bio Wiki
UncannyXmen.net Character Profile on Lifeguard

Australian superheroes
Characters created by Chris Claremont
Characters created by Salvador Larroca
Comics characters introduced in 2001
Fictional extraterrestrial–human hybrids in comics
Fictional lifeguards
Fictional people from Queensland
Marvel Comics aliens
Marvel Comics hybrids
Marvel Comics characters who are shapeshifters
Marvel Comics female superheroes
Marvel Comics mutants